Dragmatucha is a genus of moths in the family Lecithoceridae.

Species
 Dragmatucha bivia Meyrick, 1918
 Dragmatucha proaula Meyrick, 1908

References

Natural History Museum Lepidoptera genus database

Lecithocerinae
Moth genera
Taxa named by Edward Meyrick